Events in the year 2022 in Bahrain.

Incumbents

Events 
Ongoing – COVID-19 pandemic in Bahrain

 1 JanuaryBahrain authorizes the emergency use of Pfizer's anti-viral oral drug Paxlovid for adults over the age of 18 years.
 12 FebruaryBahraini authorities confirm that an Israeli military officer will be stationed inside the country as part of an upcoming international coalition consisting of 34 countries. This is the first time an Israeli officer has been sent to a military post in the Arab World.
 1 MarchBahrain issues an emergency approval for the vaccine candidate developed by Valneva, becoming the first country to approve the usage of the vaccine candidate.
 28 MarchThe foreign ministers of Israel, Egypt, Morocco, Bahrain and the United Arab Emirates, as well as the United States Secretary of State, meet in Sde Boker, Israel, and agree to hold regular meetings about regional security and commit to further expanding economic and diplomatic cooperation.

References 

 

 
2020s in Bahrain
Years of the 21st century in Bahrain
Bahrain
Bahrain